is a former professional baseball player in Japan.  He played for the Chunichi Dragons in the Japan Central League    He was born in Tokyo, Japan.

References

1972 births
Chunichi Dragons players
Japanese expatriate baseball players in the United States
Living people
Nippon Professional Baseball pitchers
Baseball people from Tokyo
Visalia Oaks players
Tokyo Yakult Swallows players